Megachile trichrootricha is a species of bee in the family Megachilidae. It was described by Moure in 1953.

References

Trichrootricha
Insects described in 1953